Leah Garrett is a professor and Director of the Center for Jewish studies, at Hunter College, City University of New York, and the head of the Hebrew program.

Academic biography 
Garrett graduated with honors from Maryhurst University in the state of Oregon in 1991. The following year she completed a Diploma in Jewish Studies at the University of Oxford, England. Garrett completed her PhD with Honors in 1999 at the Jewish Theological Seminary of America in New York City, during which she was also a Fulbright fellow at Tel Aviv University. In the same year, she was appointed as an Assistant professor at the Center for Jewish Studies at the University of Denver, Colorado, and served there in this position until 2008. In the same year, she took up a post at Monash University, Melbourne Australia as a research professorr for Contemporary Jewish culture. In 2013 Garrett was appointed as the Deputy Head of the Australian Center for Jewish Civilization at Monash University. During this time she served as honorary professor of history at the University of Warwick, England. Since 2018 she has been the Director of the Center for Jewish Studies at Hunter College.

Publications 
Garrett has published more than twenty peer reviewed articles and other publications. The most prominent are her four sole-authored books:

 Journeys beyond the Pale: Yiddish Travel Writing in the Modern World (University of Wisconsin Press: 2003)  examines how Yiddish and Hebrew writers, from Mendele Mocher Sforim to Sholem Aleichem, used travel motifs to express their complicated relationship with modernization.
 A Knight at the Opera: Heine, Wagner, Herzl, Peretz, and the Legacy of Der Tannhäuser-Shofar Supplements in Jewish Studies (Purdue University Press: 2011). In this book Garrett examines the role played by the medieval legend and the Wagner Tannhäuser opera in Jewish cultural life in the nineteenth and early twentieth centurys.
 Young Lions: How Jewish Authors reinvented the American War novel (Northwestern University Press: 2017). In this book, Garrett shows how Jewish authors used the theme of World War II to reshape the ideas of the American public about the war, the Holocaust and the role of the Jews in post-war life. This book won the Jordan Schnitzer Award for Modern Jewish History.
X Troop: The Secret Jewish Commandos of World War II (Harper Collins US, Chatto Penguin Books UK: 2021) brought Garrett the most publicity in the United States, England, Europe and Israel. The book received praise  and coverage in newspapers such as: The Washington Post, "the New york journal of books", "The Telegraph", the "Kirkus Reviews", "Publishers Weekly", and more. The Wall Street Journal crowned it as "the book of the month". The book was featured on CSPAN, Time, and CNN. The National World War II Museum hosted Garrett in June 2021 for a webinar on that book.
Garrett also was the sole editor of The The Cross and Other Jewish Stories: New Yiddish Library Series by Lamed Shapiro (Yale University Press: 2007).

References

External links
 Book Discussion with Leah Garrett about X Troop: The Secret Jewish Commandos of World War II. YouTube, September 15, 2021
 Book Review: "A Top Secret WWII Unit" at the Detroit Jewish News, by Mike Smith, November 17, 2022

Hunter College faculty
Jewish Theological Seminary of America alumni
Judaic scholars
Marylhurst University alumni
Alumni of the University of Oxford
1966 births
Living people
World War II
Yiddish-language literature